Richard Noel (May 30, 1927, Brooklyn, New York – October 20, 2017, Escondido, California) was an American band vocalist, jingle singer, and radio and television performer.

Noel sang with the Ray Anthony Orchestra, including on the hit "Count Every Star," recorded singles for the Decca and Fraternity labels, was regularly featured on radio shows in Cincinnati and Chicago, appeared on Arthur Godfrey's Talent Scouts and the Tennessee Ernie Ford Show, and began a career as a jingle singer in 1965.

In this latter pursuit, Noel was christened "The King of the Jingles", recording thousands of spots, including national jingles for McDonald's and United Airlines. In 1978 Noel recorded and released the album A Time for Love in collaboration with pianist Larry Novak. He retired to San Diego, where he was voiceover artist for Silicon Beach Software's Dark Castle.

References

External links
 Dick Noel recordings at the Discography of American Historical Recordings.

1927 births
2017 deaths
Musicians from Brooklyn
Singers from New York City
Decca Records artists